"Livin' Our Love Song" is a song co-written and recorded by American country music artist Jason Michael Carroll. It was released in April 2007 as the second single from his album Waitin' in the Country.  Carroll co-wrote the song with Glen Mitchell and Tim Galloway.

Critical reception
Deborah Evans Price gave a positive review in Billboard, calling it "lighthearted" and "engaging". She wrote that it has a "sweet, sticky melody and upbeat romantic lyric".

Music video
The music video was directed by David McClister and premiered in mid-2007.

Chart performance

Year-end charts

References

2007 singles
2007 songs
Jason Michael Carroll songs
Song recordings produced by Don Gehman
Arista Nashville singles